Magnetic Flip is the debut studio album of the American avant-rock band Birdsongs of the Mesozoic, released in 1984 by Ace of Hearts Records.

Release and reception

Never being individually issued on Compact Disc, only some of Magnetic Flip had been included on compilations such as Sonic Geology and The Fossil Record. Finally, the entire album was issued by Cuneiform Records on Dawn of the Cycads, a two-disc anthology including most of the band's early work.

Track listing

Personnel
Adapted from the Magnetic Flip liner notes.

Birdsongs of the Mesozoic
Erik Lindgren – synthesizer, percussion
Roger Miller – piano, organ, percussion
Rick Scott – piano, farfisa, synthesizer, percussion
Martin Swope – guitar, percussion
Your Neighborhood Saxophone Quartet
Steve Adams – saxophone
Allan Chase – saxophone
Tom Hall – saxophone
Cercie Miller – saxophone

Additional musicians and production
Birdsongs of the Mesozoic – mixing
Michael Cohen – drums, percussion
Richard W. Harte – production
Taki – dono
Tony Volante – mixing
Jeff Whitehead – engineering, mixing

Release history

References

External links 
 Magnetic Flip at Discogs (list of releases)

1984 debut albums
Birdsongs of the Mesozoic albums